Yahoo is a Brazilian rock band formed in 1988.

History 
Yahoo was founded in 1988 by guitarist Robertinho do Recife. It was fairly successful in Brazil during the 1990s by playing cover versions of other bands' hard rock songs translated to Portuguese. Many of their songs were also used in soundtracks of telenovelas.

Their self-titled debut album, Yahoo, had the Def Leppard's hit "Love Bites" translated as "Mordidas de Amor", and was used in the soundtrack of the telenovela Bebê a Bordo.

The next album, Oração da Vitória ("Victory Prayer"), brought them another hit, "Anjo" (cover of Aerosmith's "Angel"), again used in a telenovela, O Sexo dos Anjos.

In 1990, Yahoo released the album Yahoo 3. It was not as successful as the previous ones, but two songs, "Veneno" ("Poison") and "Somos a Luz da Manhã" ("We are the Morning Light"), were used in the soundtrack of a movie, Sonho de Verão.

Yahoo released the album Pára-Raio in 1992, with several cover songs, such as "Pára-Raio" ("Lightning Rod", a version of "Hide You Heart" by Kiss) and "Como o Vento" ("Like the Wind", a version of "Wind of Change" by Scorpions); the song "Paixão Esquecida" ("Forgotten Passion") was again used in a telenovela, Deus nos Acuda.

Their 1994 album, Caminhos de Sol ("Paths of the Sun") was more successful, with "Caminhos de Sol" used in the telenovela A Viagem and becoming a huge hit.

In 1996, not long after the release of Arquivo, the band dissolves, and the members turn their attention to a new business: they set the Yahoo Studio, in Rio de Janeiro, which would be one of the most popular recording studios in Brazil.

In 2006, they release a new album, Versões ("Versions"), consisting only of translated versions of songs by artists such as Journey, Kiss, and Poison.

Members

Current line-up
 Zé Henrique - bass guitar and vocals
 Serginho Knust - guitar, acoustic guitar and vocals
 Val Martins - keyboard and vocals
 Marcelão - drums and vocals

Former members 
 Robertinho de Recife (1988–1990) - guitar and vocals
 Marcello Azevedo (1988–1993) - keyboard, guitar and vocals

Discography 
 1988 - Yahoo
 1989 - Oração da Vitória
 1990 - Yahoo 3
 1992 - Pára-Raio
 1994 - Caminhos de Sol
 1996 - Arquivo
 2006 - Versões
 2008 -  Yahoo 20 Anos - Ao Vivo

External links
 Interview with Robertinho de Recife (in Portuguese)

Musical groups established in 1988
Brazilian rock music groups
Musical groups disestablished in 1996
Musical groups reestablished in 2006
1988 establishments in Brazil
1996 disestablishments in Brazil
2006 establishments in Brazil